The 1944 Utah State Aggies football team was an American football team that represented Utah State Agricultural College in the Mountain States Conference (MSC) during the 1944 college football season. In their 25th season under head coach Dick Romney, the Aggies compiled a 3–3 record (0–2 against MSC opponents), finished fourth in the MSC, and were outscored by a total of 109 to 88.

Schedule

References

Utah State
Utah State Aggies football seasons
Utah State Aggies football